The Four Corners Cup was a regional soccer competition among the USL Championship clubs located in states that intersect at the Four Corners: Colorado Springs Switchbacks FC, New Mexico United, Phoenix Rising FC and Real Monarchs SLC. The four clubs played each other home and away in a round robin format, with the champion determined by total points accumulated. The competition was canceled during the 2021 as Phoenix Rising were assigned to a separate division, preventing round-robin play. In 2022, the Real Monarchs moved the MLS Next Pro league, ending the competition.

2019

2020

On June 24, the league announced the structure of its Return To Play format, separating the league into eight separate groups for regional competitions. Because Phoenix was combined with the southern California clubs into Group B, while the other three cup competitors were combined with El Paso into Group C, a full cup competition was impossible for the year. The announcement of the full league Return To Play schedule created the following partial fixture list among the cup participants.

Kickoff times are in MDT (UTC-06) unless otherwise noted.

References 

Colorado Springs Switchbacks FC
New Mexico United
Phoenix Rising FC
Real Monarchs
Soccer cup competitions in the United States